The 1989 Southeastern Conference baseball tournament was held at Perry Field in Gainesville, Florida, United States, from May 11th to May 14th.  won the tournament and earned the Southeastern Conference's automatic bid to the 1989 NCAA Tournament.

Regular season results

Tournament

All-Tournament Team

See also 
 College World Series
 NCAA Division I Baseball Championship
 Southeastern Conference baseball tournament

References

External link 
 SECSports.com All-Time Baseball Tournament Results
 SECSports.com All-Tourney Team Lists

Tournament
Southeastern Conference Baseball Tournament
Southeastern Conference baseball tournament
Southeastern Conference baseball tournament
College baseball tournaments in Florida
Baseball competitions in Gainesville, Florida